Yang Dan (born October 1965) is a Hong Kong-Chinese chemist and chemical biologist. She is the Chair Professor of Chemistry and the Morningside Professor in Chemical Biology at the University of Hong Kong. She was awarded the TWAS Prize for Chemistry in 2010 and the Young Woman Scientist Prize of China in 2011.

Education 
Yang graduated with a BS degree from Fudan University in Shanghai, China, and earned her MA degree from Columbia University and her PhD in 1991 from Princeton University in the United States. After 2-year postdoc training with Stuart Schreiber in Harvard University, Yang started her independent career on Organic Chemistry and Chemical Biology at the University of Hong Kong.

Career 
Yang joined the Department of Chemistry at the University of Hong Kong (HKU) in 1993, and is now the Chair Professor of Chemistry and the Morningside Professor in Chemical Biology.

Yang's research interests include aminoxy acids and foldamores, triptolide, and oxidation chemistry. She spent 17 years researching and synthesizing potential anti-cancer compounds from the plant Tripterygium wilfordii, for which she was awarded the Young Woman Scientist Prize of China in 2011, the first Hong Kong scientist to win the prize.

In 2010, she was awarded the TWAS Prize in Chemistry for "her significant contributions to the development of novel methods for the synthesis of bioactive natural products and probes for biomedical research."

In 2017, Yang was awarded the Chemical Biology Approach to Molecular Medicine in Areas of Excellence Scheme by University Grants Committee.

In 2020, Yang was awarded the 5th Yoshida Prize by the International Organic Chemistry Foundation (IOCF).

Research interests 
Developing fluorescent/chemiluminescent  sensors for molecular detection and imaging of reactive oxygen species, lipids, metabolites and enzymes in living cells to study redox biology and human diseases.
Developing new molecular probes for proteins and nucleic acids to investigate epigenetic changes in relation to their functions.
Developing synthetic ion transporters and exploring their biological applications in eradicating cancer stem cells and drug-resistant bacteria.

References 

Living people
Hong Kong scientists
Chinese women chemists
Chinese women biologists
Fudan University alumni
Columbia University alumni
Princeton University alumni
TWAS laureates
Academic staff of the University of Hong Kong
1965 births